CLIR may refer to:

 Council on Library and Information Resources, USA
 Cross-language information retrieval
 Calling line identification restriction, one of the elements of the Caller ID system